The Nanking Incident occurred in March 1927 during the capture of Nanjing (then Nanking) by the National Revolutionary Army (NRA) in their Northern Expedition. Foreign warships bombarded the city to defend foreign residents against rioting and looting. Several ships were involved in the engagement, including vessels of the Royal Navy and the United States Navy. Marines and sailors were also landed for rescue operations including some 140 Dutch forces. Both Nationalist and Communist soldiers within the NRA participated in the rioting and looting of foreign-owned property in Nanjing.

Context
Nanking in 1927 was a treaty port located on the southern shores of the Yangtze River, a large waterway that separates northern and southern China. Because the foreign interests in China were largely American and European, squadrons of foreign naval vessels were stationed along the Yangtze to protect their citizens doing business at the treaty ports. The British Royal Navy operated the China Station under Rear Admiral Sir Reginald Tyrwhitt and the United States Navy the Yangtze Patrol; both lasted for around 80 years until World War II.

Incident
On 23 March 1927, with the rapidly approaching National Revolutionary Army (NRA) about to reach Nanjing, Beiyang warlord Zhang Zongchang gave orders for his defeated troops to withdraw from the city. Some of his soldiers who were unable to retreat in time deserted and began to loot foreign properties and attacked two foreigners who were in their way.

In the early morning of 24 March, the NRA began to enter Nanjing without any resistance from Zhang Zongchang's army. Afterwards they entered the British, American and Japanese consulates to search for suspected enemies hiding inside, but left peacefully after none were found. But immediately afterwards, uniformed soldiers and local Chinese residents started large-scale rioting against foreign interests, burning houses and attacking the British, American and Japanese consulates, and killing the American vice president of Nanking University, Dr. John Elias Williams, while almost assassinating the Japanese consul. The 6th Army of the NRA, with its large contingent of communist soldiers, systematically looted the homes and businesses of the foreign residents, and one American, two Britons, one French citizen, an Italian, and a Japanese were killed by Chinese soldiers. Chinese snipers also targeted the American consul and marines who were guarding him, which forced them to flee into "Socony Hill" (So named because of property belonging to the Standard Oil Company of New York) where American citizens were sheltering. During this mayhem, one Chinese soldier declared, "we don't want money, anyway, we want to kill."

In response, the British navy immediately sent the heavy cruiser , the light cruisers ,  
The Italian Regia Marina sent the gunboat Ermanno Carlotto.

At 3:38 pm, the NRA soldiers and Chinese rioters were driven off by high explosive rounds and machine gun fire from Emerald, Wolsey, Noa, Preston and Carlotto, and other warships may have participated in the bombardment as well. After the bombardment, foreign civilians hiding on Sacony Hill were rescued by sailors from Noa and Preston. The two American vessels fired 67 shells by this point and thousands of rifle and machine gun rounds.

By the end of March 24, Nanking was burning and littered with bomb craters and casualties from the battle. Early the next morning, just before dawn, USS William B. Preston was lifting anchor to escort SS Kungwo out of the area. She was filled with evacuees and needed protection, but just as the two ships were starting to leave, sniper fire from the riverbanks hit Preston. The Americans returned fire with their Lewis gun and silenced the attackers after a few moments.

Three hours later, as the two vessels steamed down the river, Preston was attacked again. This time, the two ships were in between Silver Island and Fort Hsing-Shan. Rifle fire was first heard, and Preston′s crew were preparing their machine gun when  guns at the fort suddenly engaged them. Several shots missed the ships, but one eventually hit Preston′s fire control platform, causing no casualties. A  gun was then aimed at the fort, and after a few rounds the Chinese guns were silenced.

Snipers once again harassed the ships, but machine gun fire from Cricket quickly forced the Chinese to retreat. Later on the Japanese sent the gunboats Hodero, Katata, Momo and Shinoki. The Italians sent the gunboat Ermanno Carlotto, the Dutch sent the light cruiser Hr.Ms. Sumatra and the French sent aviso La Marne for the evacuation of their citizens in Nanjing.

By March 26, NRA commander Cheng Qian restored order in Nanjing and successfully restrained soldiers from further hostile actions against foreign forces, while requesting the Red Cross to mediate a cease fire with foreign naval vessels. On March 27, with 70 more refugees aboard, Preston left Nanking and headed downriver. Lieutenant Commander G. B. Ashe later recalled that the Chinese had emplaced a field-piece at a river bend outside of Nanking so he ordered general quarters well in advance of the battery, but when the ship went around the bend the Chinese did not fire. By the end of that day all hostilities ended. About 40 people were killed in total. One British sailor was killed, Able Seaman from the Emerald John Knox of Glasgow and there was only one American casualty, fireman Ray D. Plumley. American forces involved in the Nanking Incident received the Yangtze Service Medal. Three U.S. Navy signalmen who maintained consular communications from the building's roof while under continuous fire were also awarded the Navy Cross.

Aftermath
Afterwards, the Nationalist Government issued a statement blaming the deserters from Zhang Zongchang's army for starting the attacks on the foreign consulates, and also accused the Communist soldiers within the NRA of committing atrocities which were wrongly assigned to the Kuomintang.

National Revolutionary Army commander in chief Chiang Kai-shek suspected that the Chinese Communist Party and Soviet advisors in the Wuhan Nationalist Government used anti-imperialists and anti-foreign sentiments to instigate the Nanjing incident, and conspired to strengthen the communists and damage the right-wing faction of the Kuomintang. Therefore, the Nanjing incident led to his determination to violently purge the communists from the Kuomintang in Shanghai on 12 April 1927, formally ending their cooperation during the Northern Expedition and officially commencing the Chinese Civil War.

In 1928, Huang Fu, foreign minister of the newly formed Nationalist government in Nanjing, reached agreements with the United States and Great Britain to settle the damages caused by the Nanjing Incident, and the Kuomintang agreed to apologize and pay significant compensation to both countries without disclosing the exact sum. Although the Kuomintang suffered financial loss as a result of this settlement, the Nationalist government did receive international recognition and established formal diplomatic relationship with two of the world's great powers for the first time after the Northern Expedition.

Literature
Edna Lee Booker, News Is My Job, (The Macmillan Company, 1940)
Alice Tisdale Hobart, Within the Walls of Nanking (Macmillan, 1929)
United States Naval Institute Proceedings, January 1928 – the account of the Lieutenant Commander Roy C. Smith, Jr., the officer in charge of the USS Noa.
Kemp Tolley, Yangtze Patrol, (US Naval Institute, 2000)

See also
Pearl S. Buck
Boxer Rebellion
Hankou incident
Jinan incident
Tungchow mutiny

References

Battles involving the United Kingdom
Nanking
History of Nanjing
20th-century military history of the United Kingdom
20th-century military history of the United States
Empire of Japan
1927 in China
Nanjing
Conflicts in 1927
March 1927 events
Northern Expedition
Attacks on diplomatic missions in China